Zdravko Šimić (born 8 September 1977) is a former Croatian footballer who plays as a midfielder for Sengkang Punggol of the Singapore S-League. He can play in both the defensive and offensive midfielder positions, and is the captain of his current club.

Club career
Šimić started his senior footballing career in his native Croatia, playing for his local club H.N.K. Rijeka.

He then moved to N.K. Pomorac where he became a more regular feature in the team's setup, helping them to win promotion to the Prva HNL (Croatian First Football League) in 2002.

In 2005, he was sold to then-Malaysian Super League club Sabah FA, where he could not help his club to avoid relegation, and in 2006, he returned home to Croatia to play for N.K. Draga.

Within two years, Šimić was on his way back to Southeast Asia, this time to Singapore where he is currently playing for Sengkang Punggol as a midfielder and its captain.

On 21 May 2008, Šimić scored his first goal for Sengkang against the Young Lions in dramatic fashion. He stepped up to take a penalty kick, subsequently blasting his effort over the bar, but the referee, Sukhbir Singh, ruled that the Cubs' defenders had stepped into the box before the kick was taken, and called for a retake. Šimić then scored from the spot on his second try. It was his first goal in the S.League, as well as Sengkang's first win in the season since it began.

International career
Šimić had a short stint playing for the Under-15, Under-17 and Under-19 teams of the Croatian National Team. There, he played alongside current Croatian National Team stars Igor Tudor (Hajduk Split) and Dario Šimić (AS Monaco).

References

1977 births
Living people
Footballers from Rijeka
Association football midfielders
Croatian footballers
Croatia youth international footballers
HNK Rijeka players
NK Pomorac 1921 players
Sabah F.C. (Malaysia) players
Hougang United FC players
NK Opatija players
Croatian Football League players
Singapore Premier League players
Croatian expatriate footballers
Expatriate footballers in Singapore
Croatian expatriate sportspeople in Singapore
Expatriate footballers in Malaysia
Croatian expatriate sportspeople in Malaysia
HNK Rijeka non-playing staff